Chavittu Nadakam (Malayalam:ചവിട്ടുനാടകം) is a highly colorful Latin Christian classical art form originated in Ernakulam district, Kerala state in India. Commonly believed that Fort Kochi is the birthplace of Chavittu Nadakam. It is noted for its attractive make-up of characters, their elaborate costumes, detailed gestures and well-defined body movements presented in tune with the rhythmic playback music and complementary percussion. This art form highly resembles European opera. 

The most sensual blend of cultural influences can be seen in this Latin Christian dance-drama.

In Chavittu Nadakam there are large number of characters all in glittering medieval dress. It is the form of traditional musical dance drama, which symbolizes the martial tradition of Kerala Latin Christians.

History
Chaviitu Nadakam is a Latin Christian folk art form of Kerala. It is originated in Cochin where the Latin Christian Portuguese missionaries have instituted their first mission. Chavittu Nadakam is believed to be originated after the arrival of Portuguese to the Kerala shores. The reason behind this assumption is that Chavittu Nadakam has a significant European character in its costumes and outfits. But there are historical evidences that Kerala had connections with the western world well before the arrival of Portuguese. Even though some argue that the Chavittu Nadakam is created by Portuguese as they felt cultural emptiness when they arrived at Kerala, there are no evidences supporting this view. Also the fact that Chavittu Nadakam uses language for its playback songs and dialogue, suggest that the art form is indigenous in origin.

There are also claims that a Tamil named Chinnathambi Annavi as the founder of this art form in 16th century at Mattancherry. He is the author of one of the most famous plays in the art form ‘Karalman Charitham’ (the story of Emperor Charlemagne aka Charles the Great). The art form was active from Kollam to Kodungallur at its peak. There were also other writers like Vedanayakam Pillai, a native of Neyyoor, Kanyakumari. In earlier days this art form was mostly encouraged by the Tamil population and were staged in church premises. Sanjon Annavi, Vareechan Annavi, Cherrechan Annavi and Anthony Annavi were some of the playwrights of the early days. Brazeena Natakam, Ouseph Natakam, Kathrina Natakam, Santi Claus Natakam, Karlman Natakam and Jnana Sundari were some of the popular plays of early days. Chavittu Nadakam attained the style and form of the operas of Europe under the influence of Portuguese and European missionaries who propagated catholic belief in coastal regions of Kerala. The Syrian Christians of Kerala who lived in inlands didn't show any inclination for the art and thus its popularity was confined to Latin Catholic community.

Performance

Chavittu Nadakam is usually performed on open stages. Sometimes the interior of a church is also a venue. The performers wear glittering European costumes. The stage is set up over wooden planks. The training master is known as Annavi. The whole play is performed through musicals. Dance and instrumental music are combined in this art form. The bell and drum are two instruments used as background score. The percussion instruments Pada Thamber and Maravaladi provides the rhythm. The actors themselves sing and act. Though it used to be an open stage performance, in the recent times this is mostly played indoor. The predominant feature of this art is the artists stamping / pounding (Chavittu) the dance floor producing resonant sounds to accentuate the dramatic situations. The actors sing their lines loudly and with exaggerated gestures stamp with great force on the wooden stage. Hence literally Chavittu Nadakam means 'Stamping Drama'. Great stress is laid on the step, which goes in harmony with the songs. In these art forms there is a great importance for dance and art. Foot stamping dance, fighting and fencing are the essential part of Chavittunadakam. Royal dresses and ornamental costumes are necessary.

The play is considered a success if at the end, the stage cave into the pressure of heavy stamping.

Librettos

The stories are mostly the heroic episodes of Bible or great Christian warriors. Historical incidents, the life and adventure of heroes like Charlemagne; stories of Alexander were the themes of Chavittu Nadakam in the 16th century. In the 18th century, spiritual themes like "Allesu-Nadakam", "Cathareena Nadakam", the victory of the Isaac, etc. were the themes. In the 19th century moral themes like "Sathyapalan"; "Njanasundhari", "Komala Chandrika", "Anjelica", "karlsman" were handled.

Most popular Chavittu Nadakam plays

 Carelman Charitham (Charlemagne the Great)
 Brijeena Charitham (Life of Queen Brijeena)
 St. Sebastian
 Daveedhum Goliyathum (David and Goliath)
 Mahanaya Alexander (Alexander the Great)
 Veerayodhakkalude Anthyam (Death of Great warriors)

See also
 Margam Kali
 Slama Carol
 Kerala Folklore Academy
 Thumpoly Church

References

External links

Chavittu Nadakam Video in Youtube
Chavittu Nadakam Video in WebIndia
Christian Folk Arts
chavittunadakam.in/

Christian folklore
Culture of Kerala
Arts of Kerala
chavittunadakam.in